Kris Kremers and Lisanne Froon were Dutch students who disappeared on 1 April 2014, while hiking the El Pianista trail in Panama. After an extensive search, portions of their bodies were found a few months later. Their cause of death could not be determined definitively, but Dutch authorities working with forensic and search-rescue investigators initially thought it likely the students had accidentally fallen from a cliff after becoming lost. However,  The circumstances and aftermath of their disappearance have resulted in much speculation about their final days.

Panamanian authorities came under fire for allegedly mishandling the disappearance and aftermath. Further investigation into the case in 2017 raised questions about the initial investigation, as well as a possible link to murders in the area. Although many theories have been presented as to what happened to Kremers and Froon, no official cause of death has been ruled.

Background 
Kris Kremers (21) and Lisanne Froon (22) both grew up in Amersfoort, Utrecht, in the Netherlands. Kremers was described as an open, creative, and responsible individual, while Froon was described as aspiring, optimistic, intelligent, and a passionate volleyball player. Kremers had just completed her studies in cultural social education, specializing in art education at the University of Utrecht; Froon had graduated with a degree in applied psychology from Deventer.

Only a few weeks prior to leaving for Panama, Froon had moved in with Kremers in a dorm room in Amersfoort, and they worked together at the café/restaurant called ‘In den Kleinen Hap’. They both saved up money for six months and planned to go to Panama together on a special six-week vacation, hoping to learn Spanish and to do something of significance for the locals, particularly volunteering with children. The trip was also supposed to be a reward to Froon for graduating.

Disappearance 
Kremers and Froon arrived in Panama on 15 March 2014. They toured the country for two weeks before arriving in Boquete, Chiriquí, on 29 March to live with a local family for a month while volunteering with children. On 1 April around 11:00, they went hiking near the clouded forests that surrounded the Baru volcano, on the El Pianista trail, not far from Boquete. Some sources say they took with them a dog that belonged to the owners of the ‘Il Pianista’ restaurant, but this has not been confirmed. The women wrote on Facebook that they intended to walk around Boquete, and it was reported that they had been seen having brunch with two young Dutch men before embarking on the trail.

Some sources claim the owners of the restaurant became alarmed when their dog returned home that night without Kremers and Froon. Froon's parents stopped receiving text messages, which both women had been sending to their families daily. On the morning of 2 April, the women missed an appointment with a local guide. On 6 April, their parents arrived in Panama along with police, dog units, and detectives from the Netherlands to conduct a full-scale search of the forests for ten days. The parents offered a US$30,000 reward for any information leading to the whereabouts of Kremers and Froon.

Discovery of backpack 

Ten weeks later, on 14 June, a local woman turned in Froon's blue backpack, which she reported finding by a riverbank near her village of Alto Romero, in the Bocas del Toro Province. The backpack contained two pairs of sunglasses, US$83 in cash, Froon's passport, a water bottle, Froon's camera, two bras, and the women's phonesin good condition.

The women's phones showed that around six hours after the beginning of their hike someone dialed 112 (international emergency number in use in The Netherlands) and 9-1-1 (the emergency number in Panama). The first distress call attempt was made by Kremers' iPhone 4 at 16:39 (4:39 p.m) and, shortly after that, another attempt was made from Froon's Samsung Galaxy S III at 16:51 (4:51 p.m), but none of the calls got through due to lack of reception in the area. None of the subsequent call attempts ever managed to go through, either.

On 4 April, Froon's phone battery became exhausted after 05:00 and the phone was never used again. Kremers' iPhone would not make any more calls either but was intermittently turned on to search for reception. Between 5 and 11 April, the iPhone was turned on multiple times but without ever entering the correct PIN code again (either no PIN or a wrong PIN code was entered). On 11 April, the phone was turned on at 10:51h (10:51am) and was turned off for the last time at 11:56h (11:56am).

Froon's Canon camera contained photos from 1 April suggesting that the women had taken a trail at the overlook of the Continental Divide and wandered into some wilderness hours before their first attempt at making emergency calls, but with no signs of anything unusual. On 8 April, ninety flash photos were taken between 01:00 and 04:00, apparently deep in the jungle and in near-complete darkness. A few photos show that they were possibly near a river or a ravine. Some show a twig with plastic bags on top of a rock; another shows what looks like a backpack strap and a mirror on another rock, and another shows the back of Kremers' head.

Discovery of remains 
The discovery of the backpack led to new searches along the Culubre River. Kremers' denim shorts were found atop a rock on the opposite bank of the tributary, a few kilometres away from where Froon's backpack had been discovered. A rumour claimed that the shorts were found zipped and neatly folded, but pictures of the shorts, published in 2021, disproved this information. Two months later, closer to where the backpack was discovered, a pelvis and a boot with a foot inside were found. Soon, at least 33 widely scattered bones were discovered along the same river bank. DNA testing confirmed they belonged to Kremers and Froon. Froon's bones still had some skin attached to them, but Kremers' bones appeared to have been bleached. A Panamanian forensic anthropologist later claimed that under magnification "there are no discernible scratches of any kind on the bones, neither of natural nor cultural originthere are no marks on the bones at all".
Had natural decomposition of the body near a river caused the bones, which are heavier than water, to sink to the bottom of the river, markings on the bone should have been visible from friction with the riverbed.

One bone fragment attributed to Kris Kremers involved a bleached half of her pelvis. Under natural decomposition a pelvis, especially from a younger person, does not break in half. Furthermore, it is not likely to have been caused by predators. Moreover, the bone was missing joint tissue that remains intact for years under natural decomposition.

In late August 2014, a fragment of skin was found on the banks of the Rio Culubre River that could be attributed to Lisanne Froon after forensic analysis. This was in an early state of decomposition, unlike the physical remains found of Kris Kremers.

In conclusion, several indications from third-party investigations point to criminal human activity.

See also

 Killing of Julie Ward
 List of unsolved deaths
 Murders of Louisa Vesterager Jespersen and Maren Ueland

References

External links
 Kris Kremers and Lissane Froon, Documentary on the disappearance and death of two Dutch tourists / Oct 2020

2010s missing person cases
2014 in the Netherlands
2014 in Panama
April 2014 events in North America
Deaths by person in North America
Netherlands–Panama relations
Unsolved deaths